The Saudara Cup is an annual cricket match played between Malaysia and Singapore. It has been played since 1970, with the exception of 2013, when it was not held, and 2014, when the match was abandoned without a ball being bowled. Malaysia have won the Cup 13 times and Singapore nine times. The other matches have all been drawn. The name of the tournament comes from the Malay word for "close relation".

Results

Other meetings

Singapore and Malaysia also meet annually in the Stan Nagaiah Trophy, a series of one-day matches, and along with Hong Kong and Thailand contested the Tuanku Ja'afar Cup between 1991 and 2004. They have also met in global and regional tournaments such as the ICC Trophy, ACC Trophy and ACC Fast Track Countries Tournament.

References

Cricket in Malaysia
Cricket in Singapore
International cricket competitions